Adrian Cașcaval (born 10 June 1987) is a Moldovan football player who last played for Romford.

Club career
Cașcaval began his career with hometown club Academia Chişinău, where he stayed for five years, before moving to Kazakh club Kaisar. After just six league games with Kaisar, Cașcaval returned to Academia Chişinău. Cașcaval made 24 Moldovan National Division appearances on his return to the club, signing for Veris in the summer of 2013. In October 2014, Cașcaval signed a contract with Costuleni. 

In February 2015, he moved on a free transfer to Uzbek club Olmaliq FK and signed a 1-year contract with the club. Following his departure from Olmaliq, Cașcaval remained in Uzbekistan and signed for Neftchi Fergana. In 2016, Cașcaval returned to Moldova, to sign for Dinamo-Auto Tiraspol, making 10 league appearances before moving to Russian Football National League club Luch-Energiya Vladivostok. In 2017, Cașcaval moved countries again, signing for Maltese club Naxxar Lions. In March 2018, he signed for Faroese club Víkingur. 

On 30 November 2018, following the culmination of the 2018 Faroe Islands Premier League, Cașcaval signed for National League South club Chelmsford City. On 9 May 2019, Cașcaval was released by Chelmsford. However, on 22 July 2019, Chelmsford announced they had re-signed Cașcaval. On 21 February 2020, Chelmsford announced Cașcaval had left the club via mutual consent. In September 2020, Cașcaval signed for Isthmian League North Division club Romford.

International career
On 11 November 2011, Cașcaval made his debut for Moldova in a 2–0 defeat against Georgia.

References

External links
 Andrian Caşcaval- sports.md
 
 

Living people
Footballers from Chișinău
1987 births
Moldovan footballers
Moldova international footballers
Moldovan expatriate footballers
Association football defenders
FC Veris Chișinău players
FC AGMK players
Expatriate footballers in Uzbekistan
Expatriate footballers in Kazakhstan
Expatriate footballers in Russia
Expatriate footballers in Malta
Expatriate footballers in the Faroe Islands
Expatriate footballers in England
FC Luch Vladivostok players
Víkingur Gøta players
Naxxar Lions F.C. players
Chelmsford City F.C. players
Romford F.C. players
Outfield association footballers who played in goal